Alicia Adela Kaufmanas (born 20 December 1940) is an Argentine sprinter. She competed in the women's 100 metres at the 1968 Summer Olympics.

References

1940 births
Living people
Athletes (track and field) at the 1964 Summer Olympics
Athletes (track and field) at the 1968 Summer Olympics
Argentine female sprinters
Argentine female long jumpers
Olympic athletes of Argentina
Athletes (track and field) at the 1967 Pan American Games
Pan American Games competitors for Argentina
Sportspeople from Santa Fe, Argentina
20th-century Argentine women